Tony Delaney (born 27 December 1975) is a former Australian rules footballer. He played as a midfielder.  

During his nine years in the Australian Football League he played for three clubs, Essendon, Fremantle and St Kilda.  Injuries restricted him to only 76 games in this time.  He is most notable as being traded by Essendon to Fremantle along with Dale Kickett and Todd Ridley which enabled the Bombers to recruit star players Scott Lucas and Matthew Lloyd.

After he retired from the AFL he returned to the WAFL and played for Claremont from 2004 until 2006.  He had previously played for South Fremantle during his time with Fremantle.

References

External links

1975 births
Living people
Fremantle Football Club players
Essendon Football Club players
St Kilda Football Club players
South Fremantle Football Club players
Claremont Football Club players
Australian rules footballers from Western Australia
Western Australian State of Origin players